The 1989 Pan American Women's Handball Championship was the second edition of the Pan American Women's Handball Championship, held in United States from 14 to 16 September 1988. It acted as the American qualifying tournament for the 1990 World Women's Handball Championship.

Standings

Results

External links
Results on todor66.com

1989 Women
American Women's Handball Championship
American Women's Handball Championship
1988 in American women's sports
September 1988 sports events in the United States